XnView is an image organizer and general-purpose file manager used for viewing, converting, organizing and editing raster images, as well as general purpose file management. It comes with built-in hex inspection, batch renaming and screen capture tools. It is licensed as freeware for private, educational and non-profit uses. For other uses, it is licensed as commercial software.

Although originally deployed only on Unix-like systems, it is now also available for Windows, Windows Mobile and Pocket PC. The extended version of XnView, called XnView MP, is available for Windows, macOS and Linux.

XnView has received five cows from Tucows. In 2006 Sveriges Television (SVT) recommended XnView in their High Definition Multi Format Test Set. Research papers about DICOM and digital watermarking used XnView for image processing.

Features 
XnView is customisable and multi-lingual. XnView can read more than 500 image file formats, some audio and video file formats, and write 50 image file formats. XnView also supports ICC profiles in JPEG, PNG and TIFF files. Classic XnView can read image formats resulting in more than 32 bits per pixel, but write support is limited to 32 bits.

XnView can show IPTC, Exif and XMP metadata, and write IPTC metadata (It can also do batch writing of IPTC metadata). It can write XMP metadata partly together with IPTC metadata. It also supports file comments (4DOS descript.ion). XnView can search files that have the same filename or data, and can search for similar graphics as well.

The display of the histogram of a picture is possible. Scripts can be created to convert, manipulate and rename a batch of images in one go. Creation of advanced slide shows is also possible. Lossless (without new encoding) turning, flipping and cropping of JPEG files is supported.

Typical image editing tools are included, for instance color and size manipulation, several filters and effects. XnView supports .8bf Photoshop plugins such as the Harry's Filters 3.0 included in the full version. Support for most raw image formats is based on dcraw.

Support for vector graphics (EPS, PS, PDF) can be integrated with Ghostscript. Classic XnView does not support Unicode, and SVG requires a commercial CAD plugin. These features are available in the multi-platform edition XnView MP based on Qt.

Classic XnView is also distributed in the PortableApps format. XnView 2.13 (2013) was the last version for Windows platforms older than Windows XP. Version 2.30 released in 2015 supports the Netpbm PAM format, can read Better Portable Graphics, and offers an add-on for Imgur uploads. As of 2018 XnView also supported HEIF and FLIF.

Related software 
The author published various other products using the classic or the multi-platform XnView code base, some examples are:
 XnView MP — the designated successor of classic XnView, which is faster, has macOS and Linux editions and has Unicode support; the current version 1.4.3
 Nview — the DOS4GW predecessor of XnView
 NConvert — command-line batch convert tool (32-bit or 64-bit); the current version 7.99
 XnConvert — GUI batch convert tool (Linux, macOS, Windows); the current version 1.96
 Xn — apps for iOS and Android (XnRetro, Sketch Me!, Gif Me!, Hypocam, etc.)
 XnShell — File Explorer / Windows Explorer shell extension (32-bit or 64-bit); the current version 4.15
 GFL-SDK — free developer library used in tools by third parties

See also 
 Comparison of image viewers

References

External links 

 
 XnView metadata How-To, August 2017. In: CarlSeibert.com

Image viewers
Image organizers
Cross-platform software
Screenshot software
Raster graphics editors